James Madden (born 1996) is an Irish hurler who plays for Dublin Senior Championship club Ballyboden St. Enda's and at inter-county level with the Dublin senior hurling team. He usually lines out as a wing-back.

Career

Madden joined the Ballyboden St. Enda's club at a young age and played in all grades before eventually joining the club's top adult team. He was at left wing-back when Ballyboden won the County Championship in 2018. Madden first came to prominence on the inter-county scene as a member of the Dublin under-21 team that won the Leinster Under-21 Championship title in 2016, while simultaneously lining out with University College Dublin in the Fitzgibbon Cup. He joined the Dublin senior hurling team in 2016.

Honours

Ballyboden St. Enda's
Dublin Senior Hurling Championship: 2018

Dublin
Leinster Under-21 Hurling Championship: 2016

References

External links
James Madden profile at the Dublin GAA website

1996 births
Living people
Ballyboden St Enda's hurlers
Dublin inter-county hurlers